Uleyevo (Üläy) is a rural locality (a selo) in Bakhtybayevsky Selsoviet, Birsky District, Bashkortostan, Russia. The population was 101 as of 2010. There are 6 streets.

Geography 
Uleyevo is located 20 km north of Birsk (the district's administrative centre) by road. Samosadka is the nearest rural locality.

References 

Rural localities in Birsky District